The Sky Brontes is a Czech single-place paraglider, designed and produced by Sky Paragliders of Frýdlant nad Ostravicí. It is now out of production.

Design and development
The Brontes was designed as an intermediate and cross country glider. The models are each named for their relative size.

Operational history
Reviewer Noel Bertrand described the Brontes in a 2003 review as "pleasant to fly, high performance and well built."

Variants
Brontes S
Small-sized model for lighter pilots. The glider model is DHV 2 certified.
Brontes M
Mid-sized model for medium-weight pilots. The glider model is DHV 2 certified.
Brontes L
Large-sized model for heavier pilots. The glider model is DHV 2 certified.

Specifications (Brontes L)

References

Brontes
Paragliders